This is a list of winners and nominees of the Primetime Emmy Award for Outstanding Prosthetic Makeup.

In the following list, the first titles listed in gold are the winners; those not in gold are nominees, which are listed in alphabetical order. The years given are those in which the ceremonies took place:



Winners and nominations

2000s

2010s

2020s

Programs with multiple wins

3 wins
 Game of Thrones

2 wins
 American Horror Story
 Six Feet Under
 The Walking Dead (consecutive)

Programs with multiple nominations

9 nominations
 American Horror Story

8 nominations
 Game of Thrones

6 nominations
 Grey's Anatomy
 Nip/Tuck
 The Walking Dead

4 nominations
 CSI: Crime Scene Investigation
 MADtv
 Star Trek: Enterprise

3 nominations
 Boardwalk Empire
 Penny Dreadful
 Six Feet Under
 Star Trek: Discovery
 Westworld

2 nominations
 American Crime Story
 The Mandalorian
 Pose Saturday Night Live Star Trek: Picard Tracey Ullman's State of the Union''

References

Outstanding Prosthetic Makeup
Makeup awards
Awards established in 2002